Gaygysyz Atabayev (October 1887 – 10 February 1938) was a Turkmen Soviet politician. He was born in Transcaspian Oblast. He was the first prime minister of the Turkmen Soviet Socialist Republic.

Biography
He was born in the village of Mäne of Tejen uyezd of the Trans-Caspian region. His father, Täçgök, was the leader of the village of Serdar and a prosperous miller; his mother was the daughter of an Afghan vizier (later, Atabayev never concealed his "non-proletarian" origin). By the age of 6 he was orphaned. He graduated from a second-class Russian-native school in Tejen (1899-1903), and then the Tashkent Teacher's Seminary (1903–07). In 1908 he took the surname Atabayev in honor of his seminar classmate and friend M. Atabayev.

He taught at the workers technical school of Merv uyezd, headed a  first class school in Baherden, was the translator for the head of Tejen District, and served in the office of the Merv Bank. He collaborated with the first Bolshevik government of the Transcaspian region. In 1918 he joined the Left Socialist Revolutionary Party.

Between September 1920 and 1922, he was chairman of the Council of People's Commissars of the Turkestan Autonomous Soviet Socialist Republic. Between February 1925 and July 1937, he was Prime Minister of the Turkmen Soviet Socialist Republic.

He was removed from office and executed during the Great Purge.

See also
 Russian Wikipedia - Атабаев, Кайгисыз Сердарович
  Turkmen Wikipedia - Gaýgysyz Atabaýew

References

Bibliography
 Атабаев Кайгисыз Сердарович // Большая советская энциклопедия : в 66 т. (65 т. и 1 доп.) / гл. ред. О. Ю. Шмидт. — Москва : Советская энциклопедия, 1926—1947.

1887 births
1938 deaths
People from Transcaspian Oblast
Great Purge victims from Turkmenistan
Turkmenistan people of Afghan descent
All-Russian Central Executive Committee members
Central Executive Committee of the Soviet Union members
Recipients of the Order of Lenin
Heads of government of the Turkmen Soviet Socialist Republic
Members of the Communist Party of the Soviet Union executed by the Soviet Union